The captains regent (Italian: Capitani reggenti, sing. Capitano reggente) are the two heads of state of the Republic of San Marino. They are elected every six months by the Grand and General Council, the country's legislative body. Normally the Regents are chosen from opposing parties and they serve a six-month term. The investiture of the captains regent takes place on 1 April and 1 October every year. This tradition dates back at least to 1243.

The practice of dual heads of government (diarchy) is derived directly from the customs of the Roman Republic, equivalent to the consuls of ancient Rome.

1243–1500

1500–1700

1700–1900

1900–2020

Since 2020

See also
Politics of San Marino
Diarchy

Footnotes

References

List
San Marino, Captains-Regent 1900-
Captains Regent
San Marino
San Marino